Song Il-kook (born 1 October 1971) is a South Korean actor. He is best known for his role in the 2006 hit drama series Jumong as the titular character.

Early life and education
Song is the grandson of politician Kim Du-han, great grandson of Kim Jwa-jin, the famous anarchist and Korean independence movement general during the early 1900s. Song is the son of politician and former actress Kim Eul-dong.

He graduated from Cheongju University, majoring in Performing Arts, and later obtained a master's degree from Chung-Ang University.

Career
Song is the vice-president of the Korean Triathlon Confederation and participated in the 2008 Seoul International Triathlon Competition. In April 2008, Song carried the Olympic torch through Seoul.

According to Reuters the most popular episodes of Jumong attracted over 90% of Iranian audience (compared to 40% in South Korea), propelling Song Il-gook to superstar status in Iran.

Song is also an amateur sketch artist. He has also modelled professionally, both on the runway and in print. In 2008, he was one of the subjects of the Kolon Christmas Photo Shoot.

In 2009, the state of Hawaii designated March 21 as Song Il-kook day. In April 2010, he was invited to the Blue House to dine with Heads of State, including the president of Kazakhstan, as Jumong garnered immense popularity in the central Asian country.

In October 2015, Song signed an exclusive contract with management agency C-JeS Entertainment.

Personal life
On 15 March 2008, Song was wed to High Court Judge Jung Seung-yeon in a private, traditional Korean wedding at the Sheraton Walkerhill Hotel in Seoul.

Song and Jung became parents to fraternal triplet sons at a hospital in Seoul on 16 March 2012. Their sons are named Dae-han, Min-guk and Man-se which, when said together mean "Long Live the Republic of Korea". Song and his sons starred in the variety show The Return of Superman from 6 July 2014 to 7 February 2016. The triplets also made a cameo appearance in Song's television series Jang Yeong-sil (2016).

Song adheres to a pescetarian diet for both health and ethical reasons.

Filmography

TV series

Film

Variety show

Theater

Awards

State honors

Notes

References

External links 

 
 
 
 

South Korean male film actors
South Korean male television actors
Living people
1971 births 
Male actors from Seoul
Cheongju University alumni